Come Rain or Shine is a 1992 Australian film about a man who becomes obsessed with a mysterious woman.

References

External links

Australian drama films
1992 films
1990s English-language films
1992 drama films
1990s Australian films